Atoms for Peace can refer to:
 Atoms for Peace, speech by U.S. President Dwight D. Eisenhower
 Atoms for Peace (band), rock/electronic supergroup
 Atoms for Peace Award, award 1955–1969 to encourage the peaceful use of nuclear technology
 NGC 7252, also known as the Atoms for Peace Galaxy